My Secret Garden: Women’s Sexual Fantasies is a 1973 book compiled by Nancy Friday, who collected women's fantasies through letters and tapes and personal interviews.  After including a female sexual fantasy in a novel she submitted for publishing, her editor objected, and Friday shelved the novel. After other women began writing and talking about sex publicly, Friday began thinking about writing a book about female sexual fantasies, first collecting fantasies from her friends, and then advertising in newspapers and magazines for more. She organized these narratives into "rooms", and each is identified by the woman's first name, except for the last chapter, "odd notes", which is presented as the "fleeting thoughts" of many anonymous women. The book revealed that women fantasize, just as men do, and that the content of the fantasies can be as transgressive, or not, as men's. The book, the first published compilation of women's sexual fantasies, challenged many previously accepted notions of female sexuality.

My Secret Garden was banned in the Irish Republic.

A sequel, Forbidden Flowers: More Women’s Sexual Fantasies, followed in 1975.

Contents
Chapter One: The Power of Fantasies

Chapter Two: Why Fantasies?
Frustration
Insufficiency
Sex enhancement
Foreplay
Approval
Exploration
Sexual initiative
Insatiability
Daydreams
Masturbation
The lesbians

Chapter Three: What do women fantasize about?
Anonymity
The audience
Rape
Pain and masochism
Domination
The sexuality of terror
The thrill of the forbidden
Transformation
The earth mother
Incest
The zoo
Black men
Young boys
The fetishists
Other women
Prostitution

Chapter Four: The source of women's fantasies
Childhood
Sounds
Women do look
Seeing and reading
Random associations

Chapter Five: Guilt and Fantasy
Women's Guilt
Men's Anxiety

Chapter Six: Fantasy accepted
Fantasies
Fantasies that should be reality
Acting out fantasies
Sharing fantasies

Chapter Seven: Odd notes

See also
Forbidden Flowers

The play
In 2009, the book was adapted into a full length stage play Multiple O: Women on Top.  Playwright John Sable chose Women on Top (another book by Nancy Friday) as the play's title largely due to its more provocative connotation.

References

1973 non-fiction books
Non-fiction books about sexuality
Book censorship in the Republic of Ireland